Bayram Şit (1930 – 29 May 2019) was a Turkish featherweight freestyle wrestler and coach. He competed at the 1952 and 1956 Olympics and won a gold medal in 1952, placing fourth in 1956. He also won a silver medal at the 1954 World Championships.

References

External links
 

1930 births
2019 deaths
Sportspeople from Denizli
Olympic wrestlers of Turkey
Wrestlers at the 1952 Summer Olympics
Wrestlers at the 1956 Summer Olympics
Turkish male sport wrestlers
Olympic gold medalists for Turkey
Olympic medalists in wrestling
Medalists at the 1952 Summer Olympics
Mediterranean Games gold medalists for Turkey
Wrestlers at the 1951 Mediterranean Games
Mediterranean Games medalists in wrestling
World Wrestling Championships medalists